James Hume may refer to:

 James Hume (architect) (1798–1868), architect in Sydney, Australia
 James Hume (cricketer) (1858–1909), Scottish-born New Zealand cricketer
 James Hume (magistrate) (1808–1862), British magistrate and political commentator in Calcutta
 James Hume (mathematician) (fl. 1639), Scottish mathematician given credit for introducing the modern exponential notation
 James Hume (superintendent) (1823–1896), New Zealand asylum superintendent
 James Hume (rugby union) (born 1998), Irish rugby union player
 James B. Hume (1827–1904), lawman in the American West
 James Deacon Hume (1774–1842), English official, economic writer and advocate of free trade
 Jim Hume (born 1962), Scottish Liberal Democrat politician

See also

James Humes (disambiguation)